Denis Parshin (Russian: Денис Паршин, born 1 February 1986 in Rybinsk, USSR) is a Russian professional ice hockey left wing who currently playing for HC Košice of the Slovak Extraliga.

Playing career 
During the past several seasons Denis Parshin has been playing for HC CSKA Moscow in the KHL. Internationally, he was a member of the U18 and then U20 Russian National team. The young forward has also been a member of Russia's senior national team during EuroTour competition that largely takes place between the four European hockey nations (Russia, Sweden, Finland, and Czech Republic). Parshin was drafted by the Colorado Avalanche in the third round  72nd overall in the 2004 NHL Entry Draft.

On June 1, 2011, Parshin signed a three-year contract extension to remain with CSKA. During his tenth season with CSKA in 2012–13, after scoring 2 points in 9 games, Parshin was traded to fellow KHL club Salavat Yulaev Ufa in exchange for Igor Grigorenko on October 10, 2012. Parshin continued to struggle offensively with Salavat to post 5 goals in 29 games before ending the season on the injured list.

In the off-season, Parshin tenure with Salavat was ended when he was traded, along with Sergei Sentyurin, to Torpedo Nizhny Novgorod in exchange for Dmitri Makarov on May 5, 2013.

In May 2014, Parshin signed a three-year deal to play for Siberian side Avangard Omsk, where he became the clubs topscrorer in his first season with a personal record of 25 goals and 56 points.

In the final year of his contract with Omsk, Parshin began the 2016–17 season, amongst the club's top two-scoring lines. In 28 games, he contributed with 5 goals and 12 points before he was traded in return to Salavat Yulaev Ufa on November 24, 2016.

On the opening day of free agency in the following summer, Parshin returned to another former club, agreeing to a one-year deal with Torpedo Nizhny Novgorod on May 1, 2017. In remaining with Torpedo through the 2018–19 season, Parshin posted his highest offensive totals since 2015, collecting 16 goals and 41 points through 61 games.

Having left Torpedo for a second time as a free agent, Parshin agreed to a two-year contract with Metallurg Magnitogorsk on May 1, 2019. In the ensuing 2019–20 season, Parshin notched 10 goals in 49 games with Metallurg before he left nearing completion of the regular season to join his first club outside Russia with HC Košice of the Slovak Extraliga on February 16, 2020. Parshin registered 4 points in 9 games with Košice before the remainder of the season was cancelled due to the COVID-19 pandemic.

As a free agent, Parshin opted to extend his career in returning to the KHL and agreeing to a one-year contract with Latvian-based, Dinamo Riga, on 3 August 2020.

Career statistics

Regular season and playoffs

International

References

External links 

1986 births
Living people
Avangard Omsk players
Colorado Avalanche draft picks
HC CSKA Moscow players
Dinamo Riga players
HC Košice players
Metallurg Magnitogorsk players
HC Neftekhimik Nizhnekamsk players
Russian ice hockey left wingers
People from Rybinsk
Salavat Yulaev Ufa players
Torpedo Nizhny Novgorod players
Sportspeople from Yaroslavl Oblast
HC Yugra players
Russian expatriate ice hockey people
Russian expatriate sportspeople in Latvia
Russian expatriate sportspeople in Slovakia
Expatriate ice hockey players in Latvia
Expatriate ice hockey players in Slovakia